Elachista leucosyrma is a moth in the family Elachistidae. It was described by Edward Meyrick in 1932. It is found in India.

References

Moths described in 1932
leucosyrma
Moths of Asia